Jabłoń-Dobki  is a village in the administrative district of Gmina Nowe Piekuty, within Wysokie Mazowieckie County, Podlaskie Voivodeship, in north-eastern Poland.

There are only 11 houses there now. During the "pacification" of Jabłoń-Dobki in World War II, Germans killed 91 local people there on March 8, 1944, most of whom were burned alive.

References

See also
Pacification operations in German-occupied Poland
Operation Tannenberg

Villages in Wysokie Mazowieckie County